"Do What You Do" is the second track and first single released from the album, The New Game, by American band Mudvayne.

"Do What You Do" is their second-most successful single, reaching number two on the U.S. Mainstream Rock chart. Mudvayne announced in an interview on Fuse's No. 1 Countdown that "Do What You Do" will have a video. Along with "A New Game" and "Scarlet Letters", "Do What You Do" includes a guitar solo; the first since "Fear", from their EP, The Beginning of All Things to End.

Personnel 
 Chad Gray − vocals 
 Greg Tribbett − guitars, background vocals 
 Ryan Martinie − bass 
 Matthew McDonough − drums
 Dave Fortman − producer, mixing

Charts

Weekly charts

Year-end charts

External links 
 Billboard review of "Do What You Do"
Video

References 

Mudvayne songs
2008 singles
2008 songs
Epic Records singles
Songs written by Chad Gray
Songs written by Ryan Martinie
Songs written by Matthew McDonough
Songs written by Greg Tribbett